"Tattoo" is a song recorded by Puerto Rican singer Rauw Alejandro. It was written by Elena Rose, Daniel Rondon, Eric Duars, Colla, Mr. NaisGai, Rafa Rodriguez, and Alejandro, while the production was handled by Mr. NaisGai, Rondon, and Rodriguez. The song was released for digital download and streaming as a single by Duars Entertainment on February 12, 2020. A Spanish language reggaeton and pop urban song with a danceable rhythm, it portrays the full happiness of falling in love with a person. The song experienced commercial success in Spanish-language markets, reaching number one in Colombia, and the top-five in Argentina and Spain. It has received several certifications, including Latin quadruple platinum in the United States. An accompanying music video, released simultaneously with the song, was directed by Marlon Peña.

A remix of "Tattoo" with Colombian singer Camilo was released on July 9, 2020, as the lead single from Alejandro's debut studio album Afrodisíaco (2020). Featuring elements of pop and urban, it is about falling in love with a girl who has the singers "wrapped around her finger", the way "Camilo is willing to get her name tattooed". The track received widely positive reviews from music critics, who complimented its lyrics. It won the award for Best Urban Fusion/Performance at the 22nd Annual Latin Grammy Awards. The track was ranked among the 25 Best Latin Songs of 2020 by Billboard.

The remix was commercially successful, reaching number one in nine countries, including Argentina and Colombia, as well as the top five in several other countries such as Mexico and Spain. On Billboards Hot Latin Songs in the United States, the song peaked at number seven, giving both singers their first ever top-10 hit on the chart. It also reached the summit of the Latin Airplay and Latin Rhythm Airplay charts, and has received several certifications, including diamond in Mexico and quintuple platinum in Spain. The accompanying music video for "Tattoo Remix", released simultaneously with the song, was filmed in Miami and directed by Gustavo Camacho. It depicts Alejandro and Camilo having an epic beach day and having fun with some tricycles along with their friends.

Background and composition

"Tattoo" was written by Elena Rose, Daniel Rondon, Eric Duars, Colla, Mr. NaisGai, Rafa Rodriguez, and Rauw Alejandro, and produced by Mr. NaisGai, Rondon, and Rodriguez for Alejandro's first studio album, Afrodisíaco. The track is a Spanish language reggaeton and pop urban song, with a danceable rhythm, portrays the full happiness of falling in love with a person. Alejandro explained about its rhythm and lyrics:

The track runs for a total of 3 minutes and 22 seconds, and its "romantic" and "sensual" lyrics include, "Yo no se ni que hacer / Cuando estoy cerca de ti / Tus ojos color café / Se apoderaron de mi / Muero por un beso / De esos que no son de amigos" (I don't even know what to do / when I'm close to you / Your brown eyes / They took over me / I would die for a kiss / Of those that are not from friends).

Release and promotion

"Tattoo" was released for digital download and streaming as a single by Duars Entertainment on February 12, 2020. To promote the song, Alejandro went on the cover of "¡Viva Latino!" playlist on Spotify, while the track was also placed on "Dale Play!" playlist on Apple Music. An accompanying music video was released simultaneously with the song. The visual was directed by Marlon Peña and produced by Marlon Films. It depicts Alejandro in "an atmosphere full of romance with his partner". On March 28, 2020, he gave his first live performance of "Tattoo" at the Coca-Cola Music Hall. The track was also included on the set lists for Alejandro's the Rauw Alejandro World Tour and the Vice Versa Tour.

Reception
Griselda Flores from Billboard gave "Tattoo" a positive review, calling the song "great". The track debuted at number 50 on the US Billboard Hot Latin Songs chart on May 2, 2020, becoming Alejandro's sixth entry. On July 18, 2020, the song re-entered the chart at the new peak of number 47. In October 2021, it was certified quadruple platinum (Latin) by the Recording Industry Association of America (RIAA), for track-equivalent sales of over 240,000 units in the United States. In Argentina, "Tattoo" debuted at number 91 on the Argentina Hot 100 on the chart issue dated March 7, 2020, becoming Alejandro's eighth entry. The following week, it climbed to number 69. On July 19, 2020, the track reached the top-five for the first time. It was certified gold in the country, for selling 10,000 copies. The song was also certified 3× Platinum+Gold by the Asociación Mexicana de Productores de Fonogramas y Videogramas (AMPROFON), for track-equivalent sales of over 210,000 units in Mexico, and peaked at number six on AMPROFON's Mexico Streaming chart. "Tattoo" reached number one in Colombia on July 10, 2020. In Spain's official weekly chart, the song debuted at number 17 on February 23, 2020. The following week, it climbed to its peak at number three, giving Alejandro his highest peak in his career at the time, surpassing "Fantasías", which peaked at number four in November 2019. "Tattoo" was later certified double platinum by the Productores de Música de España (PROMUSICAE), for track-equivalent sales of over 80,000 units in the country.

Remix

On July 9, 2020, Alejandro released a remix of "Tattoo", with Colombian singer Camilo, as the lead single from his debut studio album Afrodisíaco. It marked the first collaboration between the two singers. Evaluna Montaner and Camilo joined the original version's lyricists to write the remix version. The version features elements of pop and urban, and runs for a total of 3 minutes and 42 seconds. It is about falling in love with a girl who has the singers "wrapped around her finger", the way "Camilo is willing to get her name tattooed".

Critical reception
Upon release, "Tattoo Remix" was met with widely positive reviews from music critics. In her review for Billboard, Leila Cobo described its lyrics as "raunchy" and "graphic", comparing the song with "a breath of fresh air". She labeled it "[a] feel-good summer song that everybody would be dancing outside to, if only there was an outside". Also from Billboard, Griselda Flores stated that Camilo took "the already great" song "to the next level with his distinctive poetic lyrics and ever-so-soothing vocals". She continued praising the song as "pure bliss, with catchy and innocent lyrics". Billboard Argentinas Florence Mauro praised the remix for "its new melodies that give it fresh and innovative touches", while an author of Los 40 named it a "musical phenomenon". In 2022, Ernesto Lechner from Rolling Stone ranked the track as the Alejandro's eighth-best song, saying it "shows the ease with which Rauw could have triumphed in Latin pop, if he so desired".

Accolades
Billboard ranked "Tattoo Remix" among the 25 Best Latin Songs of 2020, as well as the 20 Best Latin Summer Songs of the year. The track has received a number of awards and nominations. It won the award for Best Urban Fusion/Performance at the 22nd Annual Latin Grammy Awards.

Commercial performance
"Tattoo Remix" became a global hit, peaking at numbers 28 and 18 on the Billboard Global 200 and Billboard Global Excl. US charts, respectively. The song's success was further solidified with a viral TikTok dance challenge which featured the song and was used in over 2.8 million videos. In the United States, where the original version of "Tattoo" was already charting on the Billboard Hot Latin Songs chart, it climbed to number 12 on the chart issue dated July 25, 2020, following the release of the remix. Thus, it marked Camilo's highest charting song in his career, surpassing "Tutu", which peaked at number 16 on November 2, 2019. "Tattoo Remix" subsequently peaked at number seven on the Hot Latin Songs on September 12, 2020, giving both Alejandro and Camilo their first ever top-10 hit. It also peaked at number one on both the Latin Airplay and Latin Rhythm Airplay charts, and number four on Latin Digital Song Sales.

In Spain's official weekly chart, "Tattoo Remix" debuted at number 14 on July 19, 2020. It subsequently peaked at number two on the chart on August 16, 2020, being held off the top spot by "Mamichula" (2020) by Trueno, Nicki Nicole, and Bizarrap. It marked Camilo's first and only top-three hit in the country, and Alejandro's second. The track was later certified quintuple platinum by the Productores de Música de España (PROMUSICAE), for track-equivalent sales of over 200,000 units in the country. In Latin America, "Tattoo Remix" experienced huge commercial success, reaching number one in Argentina, Colombia, Costa Rica, El Salvador, Guatemala, Honduras, Latin America, Panama, Peru, and Puerto Rico. On Billboard Argentina Hot 100, it holds the record as the song with the longest climb to number one, reaching number one on its 21st week. The track also peaked in the top five of Bolivia, Chile, Dominican Republic, Ecuador, Mexico, Nicaragua, Paraguay, Uruguay, and Venezuela. In Mexico, the song was certified diamond + 2× platinum + gold by the Asociación Mexicana de Productores de Fonogramas y Videogramas (AMPROFON), for track-equivalent sales of over 450,000 units. It was also certified gold by Pro-Música Brasil for track-equivalent sales of over 20,000 units in Brazil.

Music video

An accompanying music video was released simultaneously with the song. The visual was directed by Gustavo Camacho, produced by Mastermind Entertainment, and filmed in Miami. It depicts Alejandro and Camilo having an "epic beach day" and having fun with some tricycles along with their friends, including Camilo's partner Evaluna Montaner and the Argentine actress Stefania Roitman.

Track listings

Credits and personnel
Credits adapted from Spotify and Tidal.

 Rauw Alejandro associated performer, composer, lyricist
 Camilo  additional associated performer, composer, lyricist for the remix version
 Daniel Rondon composer, lyricist, producer
 Luis J. González "Mr. NaisGai" composer, lyricist, producer, piano
 Rafa Rodriguez composer, lyricist, producer
 Andrea Mangiamarchi "Elena Rose" composer, lyricist
 Eric Pérez Rovira "Eric Duars" composer, lyricist, executive producer
 José M. Collazo "Colla" composer, lyricist, mastering engineer, mixing engineer, recording engineer
 Evaluna Montaner additional composer, lyricist for the remix version
 Amber Rubi Urena A&R coordinator
 John Eddie Pérez A&R director
 Alejandro Reglero A&R director

Charts

Weekly charts

Monthly charts

Year-end charts

Certifications

Release history

See also

 2020 in Latin music
 2021 in Latin music
 List of airplay number-one hits in Argentina
 List of best-selling singles in Spain
 List of Billboard Argentina Hot 100 number-one singles of 2020
 List of Billboard Argentina Hot 100 top-ten singles in 2020
 List of Billboard Hot Latin Songs and Latin Airplay number ones of 2020

Footnotes

References

2020 songs
2020 singles
Argentina Hot 100 number-one singles
Camilo (singer) songs
Rauw Alejandro songs
Songs written by Rauw Alejandro
Songs written by Camilo (singer)
Sony Music Latin singles
Spanish-language songs